Błogoszewo  is a village in the administrative district of Gmina Korsze, within Kętrzyn County, Warmian-Masurian Voivodeship, in northern Poland.
In the years 1975–1998, the town was administratively part of the Olsztyn province. In 1973, Błogoszewo and Warnikajma villages belonged to the village of Błogoszewo.

The village has a population of 39.

References

Villages in Kętrzyn County